Journal of Vision is an open access online scientific journal specializing in the neuroscience and psychology of the visual system. It publishes primary research from any discipline within the visual sciences. Submissions go through pre-publication peer review and are indexed in PubMed.

External links
 Journal of Vision

Vision
Perception journals
Neuroscience journals
Publications established in 2001
Academic journals published by learned and professional societies of the United States